Cardiff Central police station is a 20th-century police station located in Cathays Park in the centre of Cardiff, Wales. Previously the South Wales Police's Eastern Division headquarters, the police station is currently responsible for policing the city centre.

Description
The current five storey Cardiff Central police station was designed by Cardiff's city architect John Dryburgh and built on the southern corner of Cathays Park between 1966 and 1968. It is described as "The most successful post-war building in Cathays Park" and the only post-war building in the area "to be both modern and majestic".

The detention facilities at the station were inadequate with only four cells. These were replaced by sixty cells at the new Cardiff Bay police station, which opened in 2009. Running costs of Cardiff Central in 2011 was £1 million, with a £9.1 million refurbishment planned for 2015–16.

Previously open until midnight from Sunday to Thursday and until 4am on Fridays and Saturdays, the current (2017) opening hours are 8am to 6pm.

References

External links
 Cardiff Central Police Station

1968 establishments in Wales
Buildings and structures in Cardiff
Crime in Cardiff
Infrastructure completed in 1968
Police stations in Wales
Cathays Park